Ryan Doyle is an English professional boxer who held the Commonwealth featherweight title in 2018.

Professional career
Doyle made his professional debut on 2 March 2012, scoring a third-round technical knockout (TKO) victory against Michael Stupart at the Castle Leisure Centre in Bury, England.

After compiling a record of 9–0 (5 KOs), he faced Ian Bailey for the vacant International Masters Gold super-featherweight title on 27 September 2014 at the Olympia in Liverpool. Doyle suffered the first defeat of his career, losing via TKO in the tenth and final round.

He bounced back from defeat with a TKO win against Dawid Knade in March 2015 followed by a points decision (PTS) victory against Simas Volosinas in October. His next fight came the following month on 21 November against English featherweight champion Isaac Lowe at the Manchester Arena. The fight was scored a split draw (SD), with one judge scoring in favour of Doyle with 96–95, the second scoring in favour of Lowe with 97–93, while the third scored it even at 95–95. After a TKO win against Ismail Anwar in March 2016, Doyle fought for the vacant English title in a rematch with Ian Bailey on 16 July at the Victoria Warehouse in Manchester. Doyle dropped Bailey to the canvas in the first round en route to a unanimous decision (UD) victory to capture his first professional title. The three ringside judges scored the bout 99–90, 98–91 and 97–93.

Following a stoppage win against Tamas Laska in a non-title fight in November, Doyle fought for the vacant WBA International super-featherweight title against James Tennyson on 10 June 2017 at the Odyssey Arena in Belfast, Northern Ireland. Doyle suffered the second defeat of his career, losing via sixth-round corner retirement (RTD) after Doyle's trainer pulled him out of the fight before the start of the seventh. 

He came back from defeat with two PTS wins to finish 2017–Lester Cantillano in October and Rafael Castillo in December–before challenging Commonwealth featherweight champion, Reece Bellotti, on 6 June 2018 at the York Hall in London. Doyle left the champion on unsteady legs in the fifth round after landing a right hand. He followed up with a barrage of punches to send Bellotti to the canvas, with referee Howard Foster immediately stepping in to call a halt to the contest, awarding Doyle a TKO win to capture the Commonwealth title. The first defence of his newly acquired title came four months later against Jordan Gill on 27 October at the Copper Box Arena in London. Doyle was dropped to the canvas in the seventh round and after a follow up attack by Gill, the referee stepped in and stopped the contest to prevent Doyle from taking further damage, handing him the third defeat of his career. Doyle would get the chance to regain the Commonwealth title in his next fight, challenging the new champion, Leigh Wood, on 10 May 2019 at the Motorpoint Arena in Wood's home city of Nottingham. Doyle suffered his fourth defeat, being knocked to the canvas in the tenth round. Unable to get back to his feet, he was counted out while on the floor, resulting in a knockout (KO) loss.

Professional boxing record

References

Living people
Year of birth missing (living people)
Date of birth missing (living people)
English male boxers
Boxers from Manchester
Featherweight boxers
Super-featherweight boxers
Commonwealth Boxing Council champions